Araneus nordmanni is a species of orb weaver in the spider family Araneidae. It is found in North America, Europe, Caucasus, a range from Russia to Kazakhstan, Korea, and Japan.

References

External links

 

Araneus
Articles created by Qbugbot
Spiders described in 1870